Kofax Inc. is an Irvine, California-based intelligent automation software provider. Founded in 1985, the company's software allows businesses to automate and improve business workflows by simplifying the handling of data and documents.

Since 2017, the company has been an independent portfolio company owned by private equity firm Thoma Bravo. In 2022, Clearlake Capital and TA Associates completed their acquisition of the company from Thoma Bravo.

History
Kofax was founded in 1985 as Kofax Image Products by engineers Dean Hough and David Silver, who worked together at document processing company FileNet. Silver became the company's chief executive officer and president. The company initially focused on making personal computer circuit boards to convert them into image-processing machines, and its first products were released in 1989.

In the 1990s, the company continued to develop its core image processing technology. 

In October 1997, the company went public on the Nasdaq market.

In July 1999, the company announced it would be purchased by UK-based holding company DICOM Group in a reported US$75 million cash deal, with the intent to pair Kofax Image Products, Inc.’s digital capture technology with DICOM Group's distribution services in Europe. 

In July 2000, CEO and President Silver stepped down and was succeeded by Arnold von Büren, former deputy chief executive officer of Dicom. 

In 2002, Rick Murphy was named CEO of Kofax, and von Büren was promoted to CEO of Dicom Group. 

In April 2003, Kofax acquired Mohomine Inc., an automated text classification and extraction developer.

In December 2005, Dicom Group / Kofax Inc. appointed Rob Klatell as CEO of Dicom.

In November 2007, then CEO Rob Klatell was replaced by Reynolds Bish, former CEO of Captiva Software, now part of OpenText. 

In January 2008, the company renamed Kofax Image Products, Inc. and Dicom Group as Kofax Inc.

In May 2011, Kofax Inc. announced the acquisition of Atalasoft Inc., an image software company whose primary product was a document imaging toolkit named dotImage. In December, Kofax Inc.’s US$48 million bid to purchase London IT company Singularity was accepted. This acquisition enabled business process management (BPM) and case management software to exist through public or private SaaS (software as a service) platforms.
 
In the summer of 2013, Kofax added robotic process automation (RPA) developer Kapow Software (now: Kofax RPA). In December, Kofax Inc. was added to the Nasdaq Stock Market as (KFX). 

In September 2014, Kofax acquired Softpro, an e-signature and signature verification software company in Stuttgart, Germany, as a separate entity. 

In March 2015, Kofax Inc. purchased Aia Holding, a customer communications management company in The Netherlands, in a US$19.5 million cash deal. Also in March, the company introduced Mobile ID, image validation software for capturing proof-of-identity documents required for secure processes such as opening bank accounts. On March 24, Lexmark International, Inc. and Kofax Inc. entered into a merger agreement. Lexmark acquired outstanding shares of Kofax Inc. for US$11 per share, or approximately US$1 billion. After the acquisition closed, Kofax Inc. combined with Perceptive Software, a subsidiary of Lexmark, to form an expanded business content and management software unit of their parent company. Kofax Inc. ended the 2015 fiscal year with US$297 million in revenue.

In the spring of 2016, Lexmark and its subsidiaries were acquired by an investment consortium led by Apex Technology Co. and PAG Asia Capital. The purchase was valued at US$3.6 billion.

In July 2017, private equity and growth capital firm Thoma Bravo acquired Lexmark's Enterprise Software business which consisted of three entities: Kofax, ReadSoft, and Perceptive Software. Following this, Kofax and ReadSoft combined into a single, newly independent Thoma Bravo portfolio company.

In November 2018, Kofax announced it was acquiring the Document Imaging Division of Nuance Communications. By means of this acquisition, Kofax gained Nuance's Power PDF, PaperPort document management and OmniPage optical character recognition software applications. 

In May 2019, Kofax issued a press release announcing the closing of its acquisition of Top Image Systems (NASDAQ:TISA)(TIS).

In June 2021, Kofax announced the acquisition of PSIGEN Software, Inc., a provider of document capture, content management and workflow automation software and solutions. In August, the company announced the acquisition of cloud-based print management system provider Printix.net. 

In July 2022, Clearlake Capital and TA Associates completed their acquisition of the company from Thoma Bravo.

Products
Kofax develops intelligent automation software for businesses, for applications ranging from print management, to process automation and document/pdf management. Its products are grouped into four categories: Intelligent Automation Platform; Finance & Accounting; Capture & Print; and Desktop Productivity.

The company's Intelligent Automation Platform supports digital workflows and includes the following components:
TotalAgility, a workflow orchestration software within the Intelligent Automation Platform that includes low-code, document intelligence, process orchestration, and connected systems capabilities to improve business processes
RPA, robotic process automation software that allows code-free automation of labor-intensive, multi-step tasks across systems and data sources
SignDoc, e-signature software that verifies electronic signatures for document workflows

The company's Finance & Accounting group develops an Accounts Payable (AP) Automation Platform which includes the following: 
AP Agility, artificial intelligence-enabled accounts payable software, used to simplify internal business processes
ReadSoft Online, invoice processing software that automatically captures and validates invoice data from multiple formats
Invoice Portal, an online portal for electronic invoicing

The company's Capture & Print business area develops software to support print-centric business processes, including the following:
ControlSuite, print management, capture and document security software
AutoStore, software for automated and compliant document capture 
Capture, software for processing and integrating content directly into a business's workflow from any location

The company's Desktop Productivity software includes a variety of software for managing documents. Desktop Productivity products include: 
Power PDF, software for creating, converting, editing, sharing and e-signing PDF files.
PaperPort, software for scanning, storing and managing documents

Operations
Kofax is headquartered in Irvine, California. As of 2020, it had approximately 2,000 employees in 30 countries around the world. Specialized industries include healthcare, insurance, transportation & logistics, government, finance & accounting and business process management. Customers and partners include Xerox, HP Inc., Canon Inc., Samsung, Visa Inc. and The Bank of Tokyo-Mitsubishi.

References

American companies established in 1985
Software companies established in 1985
Software companies based in California
Companies based in Irvine, California
Optical character recognition software
Document management systems
Automation software
1985 establishments in California
1997 initial public offerings
2015 mergers and acquisitions
2017 mergers and acquisitions
2022 mergers and acquisitions
Private equity portfolio companies
Software companies of the United States
Companies formerly listed on the Nasdaq